Lupi Viejo station or Lupi station is a defunct station situated on the Southrail Line of Philippine National Railways in Lupi, Camarines Sur.

History
Lupi Viejo was opened on September 13, 1931 as part of the further expansion of the Legazpi Division Line from Tabaco to Lupi via Legazpi and Naga.

During the Marcos Administration, the station building was renovated as part of the improvements of the Bicol Metro Rail Commuter.

Defunct railway stations
Philippine National Railways stations
Railway stations in Camarines Sur